, also known as , is a traditional form of puppet theatre play originating from the Indonesian island of Java.  refers to the entire dramatic show. Performances of wayang puppet theatre are accompanied by a gamelan orchestra in Java, and by gender wayang in Bali. The dramatic stories depict mythologies, such as episodes from the Hindu epics the Ramayana and the Mahabharata, as well as local adaptations of cultural legends.

 performances are still very popular among Indonesians, especially in the islands of Java and Bali.  performances are usually held at certain rituals, certain ceremonies, certain events, and even tourist attractions. In ritual contexts, puppet shows are used for prayer rituals (held in temples in Bali),  ritual (cleansing  children from bad luck), and  ritual (thanksgiving to God for the abundant crops). In events, it is used to celebrate Independence Day, the anniversaries of municipalities and companies, birthdays, commemorating certain days, and many more. Even in the modern era with the development of tourism activities,  puppet shows are used as cultural tourism attractions.

 is one of the peaks of Indonesian culture, which is the most prominent among many other cultures.  traditions include acting, singing, music, drama, literature, painting, sculpture, carving, and symbolic arts. The traditions, which have continued to develop over more than a thousand years, are also a medium for information, preaching, education, philosophical understanding, and entertainment.

UNESCO designated  – the flat leather shadow puppet (wayang kulit), the flat wooden puppet, and the three-dimensional wooden puppet (wayang golek) theatre, as a Masterpiece of the Oral and Intangible Heritage of Humanity on 7 November 2003. In return for the acknowledgment, UNESCO required Indonesians to preserve the tradition.

Etymology 
The term  is the Javanese word for 'shadow' or 'imagination'. In modern daily Javanese and Indonesian vocabulary,  can refer to the puppet itself or the whole puppet theatre performance.

History 
 is the traditional puppet theatre in Indonesia.  is an ancient form of storytelling that is renowned for its elaborate puppets and complex musical styles. The earliest evidence is from the late 1st millennium CE in medieval-era texts and archeological sites.

Indigenous origin (Java): The experts who say that  is authentic Indonesian are Brandes, G. A.J. Hazeu, Rentse, Kats and Kruyt. According to Brandes, puppets are native to Java. He presents the results of ancient Indonesian culture, such as gamelan, the monetary system, metric forms, batik, astronomy, how to grow wet rice fields, and government administration.  is closely related to Javanese social culture and religious life. Indian puppets are different from Javanese . This opinion is based on the use of terms related to the  stage which are not borrowed from other languages; in other words, these terms are original Javanese terms. Similarly, some of the other technical terms used in the  found in Java and Bali are based on local languages, even when the play overlaps with Buddhist or Hindu mythologies.

Hazeu said that wayang came from Java. The structure of the puppet is composed according to a very old model (the way of telling the puppeteer, the height of the voice, the language, and the expressions). The technical design, the style, and the composition of the Javanese plays. It grows from the worship of the ancestors. Kats argues that the technical term clearly comes from Java and that  was born without the help of India. Before the 9th century, it belonged to the native population. It was closely related to religious practices (incense and night/wandering spirits). Panakawan uses a Javanese name, different from the Indian heroes. Kruyt argues that  originates from shamanism, comparing ancient archipelago ceremonial forms which aim to make contact with the spirit world by presenting religious poetry praising the greatness of the soul.
Indian origin: Hinduism and Buddhism arrived on the Indonesian islands in the early centuries of the 1st millennium, and along with theology, the peoples of Indonesia and Indian subcontinent exchanged culture, architecture and traded goods. Puppet arts and dramatic plays have been documented in ancient Indian texts, dated to the last centuries of the 1st millennium BCE and the early centuries of the common era.

Indian mythologies and characters from the Hindu epics feature in many of the major plays performed, all of which suggest possible Indian origins, or at least an influence in the pre-Islamic period of Indonesian history. Jivan Pani states that  developed from two art forms from Odisha in eastern India, the Ravana Chhaya puppet theatre and the Chhau dance.

Regardless of its origins, states Brandon,  developed and matured into a Javanese phenomenon.

The oldest known record concerning  is from the 9th century.

In 903 CE, inscriptions called the Balitung (Mantyasih) inscriptions were created by King Balitung from the Sanjaya dynasty, of the Ancient Mataram Kingdom. They state , which means 'Galigi held a puppet show for gods by taking the story of Bima Kumara'. It seems certain features of traditional puppet theatre have survived from that time. Galigi was an itinerant performer who was requested to perform for a special royal occasion. At that event he performed a story about the hero Bhima from the Mahabharata.

Mpu Kanwa, the poet of Airlangga's court of the Kahuripan kingdom, writes in 1035 CE in his kakawin (narrative poem) Arjunawiwaha: , which means, "He is steadfast and just a  screen away from the 'Mover of the World'."  is the Javanese word for the  screen, the verse eloquently comparing actual life to a  performance where the almighty  (the mover of the world) as the ultimate  (puppet master) is just a thin screen away from mortals.

 is a unique form of theatre employing light and shadow. The puppets are crafted from buffalo hide and mounted on bamboo sticks. When held up behind a piece of white cloth, with an electric bulb or an oil lamp as the light source, shadows are cast on the screen. The plays are typically based on romantic tales and religious legends, especially adaptations of the classic Indian epics, the Mahabharata and the Ramayana. Some of the plays are also based on local stories like Panji tales.

Art form

Wayang kulit 

 are without a doubt the best known of the Indonesian .  means 'skin', and refers to the leather construction of the puppets that are carefully chiselled with fine tools, supported with carefully shaped buffalo horn handles and control rods, and painted in beautiful hues, including gold. The stories are usually drawn from the Hindu epics the Ramayana and the Mahabharata.

There is a family of characters in Javanese  called punokawan; they are sometimes referred to as "clown-servants" because they normally are associated with the story's hero, and provide humorous and philosophical interludes. Semar is actually the god of love, who has consented to live on earth to help humans. He has three sons: Gareng (the eldest), Petruk (the middle), and Bagong (the youngest). These characters did not originate in the Hindu epics, but were added later. They provide something akin to a political cabaret, dealing with gossip and contemporary affairs.

The puppet figures themselves vary from place to place. In Central Java, the city of Surakarta (Solo) and city of Yogyakarta have the best-known  traditions, and the most commonly imitated style of puppets. Regional styles of shadow puppets can also be found in Temanggung, West Java, Banyumas, Cirebon, Semarang, and East Java. Bali's  are more compact and naturalistic figures, and Lombok has figures representing real people. Often modern-world objects as bicycles, automobiles, airplanes and ships will be added for comic effect, but for the most part the traditional puppet designs have changed little in the last 300 years.

Historically, the performance consisted of shadows cast by an oil lamp onto a cotton screen. Today, the source of light used in  performance in Java is most often a halogen electric light, while Bali still uses the traditional firelight.

Making a  figure that is suitable for a performance involves hand work that takes several weeks, with the artists working together in groups. They start from master models (typically on paper) which are traced out onto skin or parchment, providing the figures with an outline and with indications of any holes that will need to be cut (such as for the mouth or eyes). The figures are then smoothed, usually with a glass bottle, and primed. The structure is inspected and eventually the details are worked through. A further smoothing follows before individual painting, which is undertaken by yet another craftsman.

Finally, the movable parts (upper arms, lower arms with hands and the associated sticks for manipulation) mounted on the body, which has a central staff by which it is held. A crew makes up to ten figures at a time, typically completing that number over the course of a week. However, there is not strong continuing demand for the top skills of  craftspersons and the relatively few experts still skilled at the art sometimes find it difficult to earn a satisfactory income.

The painting of less expensive puppets is handled expediently with a spray technique, using templates, and with a different person handling each color. Less expensive puppets, often sold to children during performances, are sometimes made on cardboard instead of leather.

Wayang golek 

  are three-dimensional wooden rod puppets that are operated from below by a wooden rod that runs through the body to the head, and by sticks connected to the hands. The construction of the puppets contributes to their versatility, expressiveness and aptitude for imitating human dance.   is mainly associated with the Sundanese culture of West Java.

This is home to some of the oldest Muslim kingdoms in Java and it is likely that the  grew in popularity through telling the  stories of Amir Hamza, the uncle of Muhammad. These stories are still widely performed in Kabumen, Tegal, and Jepara as wayang golek menak, and in Cirebon, wayang golek cepak. Legends about the origins of the  attribute their invention to the Muslim saint Wali Sunan Kudus, who used the medium to proselytize Muslim values.

In the 18th century, the tradition moved into the mountainous region of Priangan, West Java, where it eventually was used to tell stories of the Ramayana and the Mahabharata in a tradition now called , which can be found in Bandung, Bogor and Jakarta. The adoption of Javanese Mataram kejawen culture by Sundanese aristocrats was probably the remnant of Mataram influence over the Priangan region during the expansive reign of Sultan Agung. Wayang golek purwa has become the most popular form of  today.

Wayang klitik

They are constructed similarly to  figures, but from thin pieces of wood instead of leather, and, like  figures, are used as shadow puppets. A further similarity is that they are the same smaller size as  figures. However, wood is more subject to breakage than leather. During battle scenes,  figures often sustain considerable damage, much to the amusement of the public, but in a country in which before 1970 there were no adequate glues available, breakage generally meant an expensive, newly made figure. On this basis the  figures, which are to appear in plays where they have to endure battle scenes, have leather arms.

 figures come originally from eastern Java, where one still finds workshops turning them out. They are less costly to produce than  figures.

The origin of the stories involved in these puppet plays comes from the kingdoms of eastern Java: Jenggala, Kediri and Majapahit. From Jenggala and Kediri come the stories of Raden Panji and Cindelaras, which tells of the adventures of a pair of village youngsters with their fighting cocks. The Damarwulan presents the stories of a hero from Majapahit. Damarwulan is a clever chap, who with courage, aptitude, intelligence and the assistance of his young lover Anjasmara makes a surprise attack on the neighboring kingdom and brings down Minakjinggo, an Adipati (viceroy) of Blambangan and mighty enemy of Majapahit's beautiful queen Sri Ratu Kencanawungu. As a reward, Damarwulan is married to Kencanawungu and becomes king of Majapahit; he also takes Lady Anjasmara as a second wife. This story is full of love affairs and battles and is very popular with the public. The  is liable to incorporate the latest local gossip and quarrels and work them into the play as comedy.

Wayang beber 

 relies on scroll-painted presentations of the stories being told.  has strong similarities to narratives in the form of illustrated ballads that were common at annual fairs in medieval and early modern Europe. They have also been subject to the same fate—they have nearly vanished, although there are still some groups of artists who support  in places such as Surakarta (Solo) in Central Java.
Chinese visitors to Java during the 15th century described a storyteller who unrolled scrolls and told stories that made the audience laugh or cry. A few scrolls of images remain from those times, found today in museums. There are two sets, hand-painted on hand-made bark cloth, that are still owned by families who have inherited them from many generations ago, in Pacitan and Wonogiri, both villages in Central Java. Performances, mostly in small open-sided pavilions or auditoriums, take place according to the following pattern:

Then, speaking and singing, he narrates the episode in more detail. In this manner, in the course of the evening he unrolls several scrolls one at a time. Each scene in the scrolls represents a story or part of a story. The content of the story typically stems from the Panji romances which are semi-historical legends set in the 12th–13th century East Javanese kingdoms of Jenggala, Daha and Kediri, and also in Bali.

Wayang wong 

The show also integrates dance by the human characters into the dramatic performance. It typically shows episodes of the Ramayana or the Mahabharata.

Wayang topeng 

 or  theatrical performances take themes from the Panji cycle of stories from the kingdom of Janggala.

 centers on a love story about Princess Candra Kirana of Kediri and Raden Panji Asmarabangun, the legendary crown prince of Janggala. Candra Kirana was the incarnation of Dewi Ratih (the Hindu goddess of love) and Panji was an incarnation of Kamajaya (the Hindu god of love). Kirana's story has been given the title Smaradahana ("The fire of love"). At the end of the complicated story they finally marry and bring forth a son named Raja Putra. Originally,  was performed only as an aristocratic entertainment in the palaces of Yogyakarta and Surakarta. In the course of time, it spread to become a popular and folk form as well.

Stories
 characters are derived from several groups of stories and settings. Another group of characters is derived from the Panji cycle, natively developed in Java during the Kediri Kingdom; these stories are set in the twin Javanese kingdoms of Janggala and Panjalu (Kediri).

Wayang purwa
 (Javanese for 'ancient' or 'original ') refer to  that are based on the Hindu epics the Ramayana and Mahabharata.

In Central Java, popular  characters include the following (Notopertomo & Jatirahayu 2001):

Satriya
Bima
Arjuna
Dursasana
Nakula
Sadewa
Antareja
Ghatotkaca
Antasena
Abimanyu
Wisanggeni
Irawan
Sumantri
Wibisana

Raja
Arjuna Sasrabahu
Rama Wijaya
Dasamuka
Destarata
Pandu Dewanata
Subali and Sugriwa
Barata
Baladewa
Duryudana
Kresna
Karna
Yudhistira

Dewa
Sang Hyang Tunggal
Sang Hyang Wenang
Batara Narada
Batara Guru
Dewa Ruci
Batara Indra
Batara Surya
Batara Wisnu
Sang Hyang Nagaraja
Lembu Andini
Batara Ganesha

Resi
Anoman
Bhisma
Durna
Rama Bargawa

Putri
Sinta
Kunti
Drupadi
Sumbadra
Srikandi

Abdi
Semar
Gareng
Petruk
Bagong

Raksasa
Kumbakarna
Sarpakanaka
Indrajit Megananda
Sukrasana
Kalabendana
Cakil

Wayang panji
Derived from the Panji cycles, natively developed in Java during the Kediri Kingdom, the story set in the twin Javanese kingdoms of Janggala and Panjalu (Kediri).
Raden Panji, alias Panji Asmoro Bangun, alias Panji Kuda Wanengpati, alias Inu Kertapati
Galuh Chandra Kirana, alias Sekartaji
Panji Semirang, alias Kuda Narawangsa, the male disguise of Princess Kirana
Anggraeni

Wayang Menak

 is a cycle of  puppet plays that feature the heroic exploits of Wong Agung Jayengrana, who is based on the 12th-century Muslim literary hero Amir Hamzah.  stories have been performed in the islands of Java and Lombok in the Indonesian archipelago for several hundred years. The  tradition most likely originated along the north coast of Java under Chinese Muslim influences and spread East and South and is now most commonly found in the South Coastal region of Kabumen and Yogyakarta.

The word  is a Javanese honorific title that is given to people who are recognized at court for their exemplary character even though they are not nobly born. Jayengrana is just such a character who inspires allegiance and devotion through his selfless modesty and his devotion to a monotheistic faith called the "Religion of Abraham." Jayengrana and his numerous followers do battle with the pagan faiths that threaten their peaceable realm of Koparman. The chief instigator of trouble is Pati Bestak, counselor to King Nuresewan, who goads pagan kings to capture Jayengrana's wife Dewi Munninggar. The pagan Kings eventually fail to capture her and either submit to Jayengrana and renounce their pagan faith or die swiftly in combat.

The literary figure of Amir Hamzah is loosely based on the historic person of Hamza ibn Abdul-Muttalib who was the paternal uncle of Muhammad. Hamzah was a fierce warrior who fought alongside Muhammad and died in the battle of Uhud in 624 CE. the literary tradition traveled from Persia to India and from then on to Southeast Asia where the court poet Yasadipura I (1729-1802) set down the epic in the Javanese language in the Serat Menak.

 Wong Agung Jayengrana/Amir Ambyah/Amir Hamzah
 Prabu Nursewan
 Umar Maya
 Umar Madi
 Dewi Retna Muninggar

Wayang Kancil
Even the playing is not much different, accompanied by a gamelan. The language used by the puppeteer depends on the location of the performance and the type of audience. If the audience is a child, generally the puppeteer uses Javanese Ngoko in its entirety, but sometimes Krama Madya and Krama Inggil are inserted in human scenes.
The puppets are carved, painted, drawn realistically, and adapted to the puppet performance. Figures depicted in the form of prey animals such as tigers, elephants, buffaloes, cows, reptiles, and fowl such as crocodiles, lizards, snakes, various types of birds, and other animals related to the  tale. There are also human figures, including Pak Tani and Bu Tani, but there are not many human figures narrated. The total number of puppets is only about 100 pieces per set.

Other stories

The historically popular  typically is based on the Hindu epics the Mahabharata and the Ramayana. In the 1960s, the Christian missionary effort adopted the art form to create . The Javanese Jesuit Brother Timotheus L. Wignyosubroto used the show to communicate to the Javanese and other Indonesians the teachings of the Bible and of the Catholic Church in a manner accessible to the audience. Similarly,  has deployed  for the religious teachings of Islam, while  has used it as a medium for national politics.

Cultural context
Its initial function,  is a ritual intended for ancestral spirits of the hyang belief. Furthermore,  undergoes a shift in role, namely as a medium for social communication. Because of the flexibility of  puppets, they still exist today and are used for various purposes.  functions can be grouped into three, namely:

Tatanan (norms and values)
 is a performance medium that can contain all aspects of human life. In the  puppets contain order, namely a norm or convention that contains ethics (moral philosophy). These norms or conventions are agreed upon and used as guidelines for the mastermind artists. In the puppet show, there are rules of the game along with the procedures for puppetry and how to play the puppet, from generation to generation and tradition, over time it becomes something that is agreed upon as a guideline (convention).

 is an educational medium that focuses on moral and character education. Character education is something that is urgent and fundamental; character education can form a person who has good behavior.

Tuntunan (guidelines)
 is a communicative medium in society.  is used as a means of understanding a tradition, an approach to society, lighting, and disseminating values.  as a medium for character education lies not only in the elements of the story, the stage, the instruments, and the art of puppetry, but also the embodiment of values in each  character. The embodiment of  characters can describe a person's character. From the puppet one can learn about leadership, courage, determination, honesty, and sincerity. Apart from that, the puppets can reflect the nature of anger, namely greed, jealousy, envy, cruelty, and ambition.

Tontonan (entertainment)
 puppet performances are a form of entertainment for the community.  performances in the form of theatre performances are still very popular especially in the islands of Java and Bali. Puppet shows are still the favorite of the community and are often included in TV, radio, YouTube, and other social media.  performances present a variety of arts such as drama, music, dance, literary arts, and fine arts.

Artist

Dalang

It is he who sits behind the screen, sings and narrates the dialogues of different characters of the story. With a traditional orchestra in the background to provide a resonant melody and its conventional rhythm, the dalang modulates his voice to create suspense, thus heightening the drama. Invariably, the play climaxes with the triumph of good over evil. The  is highly respected in Indonesian culture for his knowledge, art and as a spiritual person capable of bringing to life the spiritual stories in the religious epics.

They are still present in traditional Balinese painting today. The figures are painted, flat (5 to at most 15 mm — about half an inch — thick) woodcarvings with movable arms. The head is solidly attached to the body.  can be used to perform puppet plays either during the day or at night.

 today is both the most ancient and the most popular form of puppet theatre in the world. Hundreds of people will stay up all night long to watch the superstar performers, who command extravagant fees and are international celebrities. Some of the most famous  in recent history are Ki Nartosabdho, Ki Anom Suroto, Ki Asep Sunandar Sunarya, Ki Sugino, and Ki Manteb Sudarsono.

Sindhen

A good singer must have extensive communication skills and good vocal skills as well as the ability to sing many songs. The title Sinden comes from the word  which means 'rich in songs' or 'who sing the song'.  can be interpreted as someone singing a song.

Wiyaga

Wayang Museum
The Wayang Museum is located in the tourist area of the Kota Tua Jakarta (old city) in Jalan Pintu Besar Utara No.27, Jakarta 11110, Indonesia. The Wayang Museum is adjacent to the Jakarta Historical Museum.

There is also a collection of masks (topeng), gamelan, and  paintings. The collections are not only from Indonesia, but there are many collections of puppets from various countries such as Malaysia, Thailand, Cambodia, Suriname, China, Vietnam, France, India, Turkey, and many other countries.

Gallery

See also

 Wayang kulit
 Wayang golek
 Wayang beber
 Culture of Indonesia
 Javanese culture
 Gamelan
 Wayang Museum

References 

 Signell, Karl. Shadow Music of Java. 1996 Rounder Records CD #5060, Cambridge MA.
 This article was initially translated from the German-language Wikipedia article.
 Poplawska, Marzanna. Asian Theatre Journal. Fall 2004, Vol. 21, p. 194–202.

Further reading 
 

 Brandon, James (1970). On Thrones of Gold — Three Javanese Shadow Plays. Harvard.
 Ghulam-Sarwar Yousof (1994). Dictionary of Traditional South-East Asian Theatre. Oxford University Press.
 Clara van Groenendael, Victoria (1985). The Dalang Behind the Wayang. Dordrecht, Foris.
 Keeler, Ward (1987). Javanese Shadow Plays, Javanese Selves. Princeton University Press.
 Keeler, Ward (1992). Javanese Shadow Puppets. OUP.
 Long, Roger (1982). Javanese shadow theatre: Movement and characterization in Ngayogyakarta wayang kulit. Umi Research Press.
 Mellema, R.L. (1988). Wayang Puppets: Carving, Colouring, Symbolism. Amsterdam, Royal Tropical Institute, Bulletin 315.
 Mudjanattistomo (1976). Pedhalangan Ngayogyakarta. Yogyakarta (in Javanese).
 Signell, Karl (1996). Shadow Music of Java. CD booklet. Rounder Records CD 5060.
 Soedarsono (1984). Wayang Wong. Yogyakarta, Gadjah Mada University Press.

External links 

 Historical Development of Puppetry: Scenic Shades (includes information about wayang beber, kulit, klitik and golek)
 Seleh Notes article on identifying Central Javanese wayang kulit
 Wayang Orang (wayang wong) traditional dance, from Indonesia Tourism
 Wayang Klitik: a permanent exhibit of Puppetry Arts Museum
 Wayang Golek Photo Gallery, includes description, history and photographs of individual puppets by Walter O. Koenig
 Wayang Kulit: The Art form of the Balinese Shadow Play by Lisa Gold
 Wayang Puppet Theatre on the Indonesian site of UNESCO
 The Wayang Golek Wooden Stick Puppets of Java, Indonesia (commercial site)
 An overview of the Shadow Puppets tradition (with many pictures) in a site to Discover Indonesia
 Wayang Kulit exhibition at the Museum of International Folk Art
 Wayang Kulit Collection of Shadow Puppets, Simon Fraser University Museum of Archaeology & Ethnology digitized on Multicultural Canada website
 Contemporary Wayang Archive, by the National University of Singapore
 Wayang Kontemporer, an interactive PhD dissertation on Contemporary Wayang Archive

 
Indonesian culture
Masterpieces of the Oral and Intangible Heritage of Humanity
Traditional drama and theatre of Indonesia
Indonesian words and phrases
Theatre in Indonesia